This is a list of high schools in the state of Minnesota.

Aitkin County
Aitkin High School, Aitkin
Hill City High School, Hill City
McGregor High School, McGregor

Anoka County
Andover High School, Andover
Anoka High School, Anoka
Blaine High School, Blaine
Bridges School, Andover
Centennial High School, Circle Pines
Columbia Heights High School, Columbia Heights
Coon Rapids High School, Coon Rapids
Fridley High School, Fridley
Legacy Christian Academy,  Andover
PACT Charter School, Ramsey
Paladin Career and Technical High School, Blaine
Saint Francis Christian School, St. Francis
Saint Francis High School, St. Francis 
Spring Lake Park High School, Spring Lake Park
Totino-Grace High School, Fridley
Woodcrest Baptist Academy, Fridley

Becker County
Detroit Lakes High School, Detroit Lakes
Frazee High School, Frazee
Lake Park Audubon Secondary School, Lake Park

Beltrami County
Bemidji High School, Bemidji
Blackduck High School, Blackduck
Red Lake High School, Red Lake

Benton County
Foley High School, Foley
Sauk Rapids-Rice High School, Sauk Rapids

Big Stone County
Clinton-Graceville-Beardsley High School, Graceville
Ortonville High School, Ortonville

Blue Earth County
Immanuel Lutheran School, Mankato
Lake Crystal Wellcome Memorial Secondary School, Lake Crystal
Loyola Catholic School, Mankato
Mankato East High School, Mankato
Mankato West High School, Mankato
Maple River High School, Mapleton
RiverBend Academy Charter School, Mankato
St. Clair High School, St. Clair

Brown County
Cathedral High School, New Ulm
Comfrey Public School, Comfrey
New Ulm High School, New Ulm
St. Mary's High School, Sleepy Eye
Sleepy Eye High School, Sleepy Eye
Springfield High School, Springfield

Carlton County
Barnum High School, Barnum
Carlton High School, Carlton
Cloquet High School, Cloquet
Cromwell-Wright High School, Cromwell
Lincoln High School, Esko
Moose Lake High School, Moose Lake
Wrenshall High School, Wrenshall

Carver County
Central High School, Norwood
Chanhassen High School, Chanhassen
Chaska High School, Chaska
Holy Family Catholic High School, Victoria
Integrated Arts Academy, Chaska
Lutheran High School, Mayer
Southwest Christian High School, Chaska
Waconia High School, Waconia
Watertown-Mayer High School, Watertown

Cass County
Cass Lake-Bena Secondary School, Cass Lake
Northland Secondary School, Remer
Pillager Area Charter School, Pillager
Pillager Secondary School, Pillager
Pine River-Backus Secondary School, Pine River
Walker-Hackensack-Akeley Secondary School, Walker

Chippewa County
MACCRAY High School, Clara City
Montevideo Senior High School, Montevideo

Chisago County
Chisago Lakes Baptist School, Chisago City
Chisago Lakes High School, Lindstrom
North Branch Area High School, North Branch
Rush City Secondary School, Rush City

Clay County
Barnesville Secondary School, Barnesville
Dilworth-Glyndon-Felton Senior School, Glyndon
Hawley Secondary School, Hawley
Moorhead High School, Moorhead
Park Christian School, Moorhead
Ulen-Hitterdal Secondary School, Ulen

Clearwater County
Bagley High School, Bagley
Clearbrook-Gonvick Secondary School, Clearbrook

Cook County
Cook County Senior School, Grand Marais

Cottonwood County
Mountain Lake Christian School, Mountain Lake
Red Rock Central Elementary ISD 2884, Jeffers
Mountain Lake Public School, Mountain Lake
Westbrook-Walnut Grove Senior School, Westbrook
Windom Senior School, Windom

Crow Wing County
Brainerd High School, Brainerd
Crosby-Ironton Secondary School, Crosby
Lake Region Christian School, Baxter
Pequot Lakes High School, Pequot Lakes

Dakota County
Apple Valley High School, Apple Valley
Burnsville High School, Burnsville
Christian Life School, Farmington
Convent of the Visitation, Mendota Heights
Eagan High School, Eagan
Eastview High School, Apple Valley
Farmington High School, Farmington
First Baptist School, Rosemount
Hastings High School, Hastings
Two Rivers High School, Mendota Heights
Lakeville North High School, Lakeville
Lakeville South High School, Lakeville
Randolph Secondary School, Randolph
Rosemount High School, Rosemount
School of Environmental Studies, Apple Valley
St. Croix Lutheran High School, West St. Paul
Saint Thomas Academy, Mendota Heights
Simley High School, Inver Grove Heights
South Saint Paul High School
Trinity School at River Ridge, Eagan

Dodge County
Hayfield High School, Hayfield
Kasson-Mantorville High School, Kasson
Triton Senior High School, Dodge Center

Douglas County
Brandon High School, Brandon
Evansville High School, Evansville
Jefferson High School, Alexandria
Lakes Area Charter School, Osakis
Osakis Secondary School, Osakis

Faribault County
Blue Earth Area High School, Blue Earth
Elmore Academy, Elmore
Shattuck-Saint_Mary's
United South Central Senior School, Wells

Fillmore County
Fillmore Central High School, Harmony
Kingsland Senior School, Spring Valley
Lanesboro Secondary School, Lanesboro
Mabel-Canton Secondary School, Mabel
Rushford-Peterson Senior School, Rushford

Freeborn County
Albert Lea High School, Albert Lea
Alden-Conger High School, Alden
Glenville-Emmons Senior School, Glenville

Goodhue County
Cannon Falls Area Schools, Cannon Falls
Goodhue Secondary School, Goodhue
Kenyon-Wanamingo High School, Kenyon
Pine Island High School, Pine Island
Red Wing High School, Red Wing
Zumbrota-Mazeppa Senior School, Zumbrota

Grant County
Ashby High School, Ashby
Herman Secondary School, Herman
West Central Area Secondary School, Barrett

Hennepin County

Calvin Christian High School, Crystal
Champlin Park High School, Champlin
Edina High School, Edina
Mound-Westonka Secondary School, Minnetrista
Orono High School, Long Lake
Osseo Senior High School, Osseo
Robbinsdale Cooper High School, New Hope
Rockford High School, Rockford
Rogers High School, Rogers
St. Anthony Village High School, St. Anthony

Bloomington

John F. Kennedy High School
United Christian Academy
Thomas Jefferson High School

Brooklyn Center

Brooklyn Center High School
SAGE Academy Charter School

Brooklyn Park

Maranatha Christian Academy
Park Center Senior High School

Eden Prairie

Eagle Ridge Academy
Eden Prairie High School
The International School of Minnesota
Mainstreet School of Performing Arts

Golden Valley

Arts High School
Breck School

Maple Grove

Heritage Christian Academy
Maple Grove Senior High School

Minneapolis

Public Schools

Edison High School
FAIR School for Arts
Heritage Academy
North Community High School
Patrick Henry High School
Roosevelt High School
South High School
Southwest High School
Washburn High School
Wellstone International High School

Charter Schools

Ascension Academy Charter School
El Colegio Charter School
Four Directions Charter School
Lincoln International High School
Menlo Park School
Minnesota Transitions Charter School
Watershed High School

Private Schools

The Blake School
De La Salle High School
Grace Academy
Minnehaha Academy

Minnetonka

Hopkins High School
Minnetonka Christian Academy
Minnetonka High School

Plymouth

 Excel High School
Fourth Baptist Christian School
Northgate Academy
Providence Academy
Robbinsdale Armstrong High School
Wayzata High School
West Lutheran High School

Richfield

Academy of Holy Angels
Richfield High School

St. Louis Park

Benilde-St. Margaret's School
Groves Academy
Saint Louis Park High School

Houston County
Caledonia High School, Caledonia
Houston High School, Houston
La Crescent Senior High School, La Crescent
Spring Grove Secondary School, Spring Grove

Hubbard County
Laporte Secondary School, Laporte
Nevis Secondary School, Nevis
Park Rapids Senior School, Park Rapids

Isanti County
Braham Area High School, Braham
Cambridge Christian School, Cambridge
Cambridge-Isanti High School, Cambridge

Itasca County
Bigfork High School, Bigfork
Deer River Secondary School, Deer River
Grand Rapids High School, Grand Rapids
Greenway High School, Coleraine
Nashwauk Secondary School, Nashwauk
Thistledew School, Togo

Jackson County
Heron Lake-Okabena High School, Okabena
Jackson County Central Senior School, Jackson

Kanabec County
Mora Secondary School, Mora
Ogilvie High School, Ogilvie

Kandiyohi County
New London-Spicer Senior School, New London
Willmar High School, Willmar
Central Minnesota Christian School, Prinsburg
Community Christian School, Willmar

Kittson County
Kittson Central Secondary School, Hallock
Lancaster High School, Lancaster
Tri-County Secondary School, Karlstad

Koochiching County
Falls High School, International Falls
Indus Secondary School, Birchdale
Littlefork-Big Falls Secondary School, Littlefork
Northome Secondary School, Northome

Lac Qui Parle County
Dawson-Boyd Secondary School, Dawson
Lac Qui Parle Valley Secondary School, Madison

Lake County
Kelley Secondary School, Silver Bay
Two Harbors Secondary School, Two Harbors

Lake of the Woods County
Lake of the Woods School, Baudette

Le Sueur County
Cleveland High School, Cleveland
Le Sueur-Henderson Secondary School, Le Sueur
Tri-City United High School, Montgomery-Lonsdale-Le Center
Waterville-Elysian-Morristown High School, Waterville

Lincoln County
RTR High School, Tyler
Hendricks Public High School, Hendricks

Lyon County
Lakeview Secondary School, Cottonwood
Marshall Senior High School, Marshall
Minneota Secondary School, Minneota
Tracy High School, Tracy

Mahnomen County
Mahnomen Secondary School, Mahnomen
Waubun Secondary School, Waubun

Marshall County
Grygla Secondary School, Grygla
Marshall County Central High School, Newfolden
Stephen-Argyle Central High School, Stephen
Warren-Alvarado-Oslo Secondary School, Warren

Martin County
Fairmont Area High School, Fairmont
Granada-Huntley-East Chain Schools, Granada
Martin County West Schools, Sherburn-Welcome-Trimont
Martin Luther High School, Northrop
Truman High School, Truman

McLeod County
Glencoe-Silver Lake Senior School, Glencoe
Holy Trinity High School, Winsted
Hutchinson High School, Hutchinson
Lester Prairie Secondary School, Lester Prairie
Maplewood Academy, Hutchinson

Meeker County
A.C.G.C. Secondary School, Grove City
Eden Valley Secondary School, Eden Valley
Litchfield Senior High School, Litchfield

Mille Lacs County
Faith Christian School, Foreston
Isle Secondary School, Isle
Milaca Secondary School, Milaca
Onamia Secondary School, Onamia
Princeton High School, Princeton
Isle high school,Isle MN

Morrison County
Healy Secondary School, Pierz
Little Falls Community High School, Little Falls
Royalton Secondary School, Royalton
Swanville Secondary School, Swanville
Upsala Secondary School, Upsala

Mower County
Austin High School, Austin
Grand Meadow Secondary School, Grand Meadow
Leroy-Ostrander High School, Leroy
Lyle Secondary School, Lyle
Pacelli High School, Austin
Southland High School, Adams

Murray County
Fulda High School, Fulda
Murray County Central High School, Slayton

Nicollet County
Minnesota Valley Lutheran High School, New Ulm
Nicollet Secondary School, Nicollet
St. Peter High School, St. Peter

Nobles County
Adrian Secondary School, Adrian
Ellsworth Secondary School, Ellsworth
Worthington Senior High School, Worthington

Norman County
Ada-Borup Secondary School, Ada
Norman County East High School, Twin Valley
Norman County West Secondary School, Halstad

Olmsted County
Byron High School, Byron
Century High School, Rochester
Chosen Valley High School, Chatfield
Dover-Eyota Secondary School, Eyota
Faith Christian School, Rochester
John Marshall High School, Rochester
Lourdes High School, Rochester
Mayo High School, Rochester
Schaeffer Academy, Rochester
Stewartville Senior School, Stewartville
Studio Academy Charter, Rochester

Otter Tail County
Battle Lake High School, Battle Lake
Fergus Falls Senior High School, Fergus Falls
Henning Secondary School, Henning
Hillcrest Lutheran Academy, Fergus Falls
New York Mills Secondary School, New York Mills
Parkers Prairie Secondary School, Parkers Prairie
Pelican Rapids Secondary School, Pelican Rapids
Perham High School, Perham 
Underwood Secondary School, Underwood

Pennington County
Goodridge Secondary School, Goodridge
Lincoln Senior School, Thief River Falls

Pine County
East Central High School, Finlayson
Hinckley-Finlayson High School, Hinckley
Pine City High School, Pine City
Willow River High School, Willow River

Pipestone County
Edgerton Secondary School, Edgerton
Pipestone Area High School, Pipestone
Southwest Minnesota Christian High School, Edgerton

Polk County
Climax Secondary School, Climax
Crookston High School, Crookston
East Grand Forks Senior High School, East Grand Forks
Fertile-Beltrami Secondary School, Fertile
Fosston Secondary School, Fosston
Sacred Heart High School, East Grand Forks
Win-E-Mac Secondary School, Erskine

Pope County
Minnewaska Area High School 
Minnewaska Secondary School, Glenwood

Ramsey County

Academy for Sciences and Agriculture High School, Vadnais Heights
Calvin Academy, Mounds View
Calvin Christian High School, Fridley
Irondale Senior High School, New Brighton
Mounds View Senior High School, Arden Hills
North High School, North St. Paul
St. Odilia School, Shoreview
White Bear Lake Area High School, White Bear Lake

Maplewood

Hill-Murray School
Liberty Classical Academy
Mounds Park Academy

Roseville

Concordia Academy
Fairview Alternative High School
Roseville Area High School

St. Paul

Public Schools

Como Park Senior High School
Gordon Parks High School
Harding Senior High School
Highland Park High School
Humboldt Senior High School
Johnson Senior High School
Saint Paul Central High School

Charter Schools

Avalon School
City Academy High School
Community of Peace Academy
Great River Charter Montessori School
High School for Recording Arts
Hmong College Prep Academy
Jennings Experiential High School

Private Schools

Cretin-Derham Hall High School
Saint Agnes High School
Saint Bernard's High School
St. Paul Academy and Summit School

Red Lake County
Lafayette High School, Red Lake Falls
Oklee Secondary School, Oklee

Redwood County
Cedar Mountain Secondary School, Morgan
Redwood Valley High School, Redwood Falls
Red Rock Central ISD 2884, Lamberton
Wabasso Secondary School, Wabasso

Renville County
BOLD Senior School, Olivia
Renville County West Senior School, Renville
Buffalo Lake-Hector-Stewart  Renville

Rice County
Arcadia Charter School, Northfield
Bethlehem Academy, Faribault
Faribault High School, Faribault
Minnesota State Academy for the Blind, Faribault
Minnesota State Academy for the Deaf, Faribault
Northfield High School, Northfield

Rock County
Hills-Beaver Creek Secondary School, Hills
Luverne Senior High School, Luverne

Roseau County
Badger Community School, Badger
Greenbush-Middle River High School, Greenbush
Roseau Secondary School, Roseau
Warroad Senior School, Warroad

St. Louis County

Albrook Secondary School, Saginaw
Babbitt Secondary School, Babbitt
Cherry Secondary School, Iron
Chisholm High School, Chisholm
Cook Secondary School, Cook
Cotton Secondary School, Cotton
Floodwood Secondary School, Floodwood
Hermantown Senior School, Hermantown
Hibbing High School, Hibbing
Memorial High School, Ely
Mesabi East High School, Aurora
Mountain Iron-Buhl Secondary School, Mountain Iron
Orr Secondary School, Orr
Proctor High School, Proctor
Virginia High School, Virginia

Duluth

Central High School (CLOSED)
Denfeld High School
East High School
Harbor City International School
Lake Superior High School
Lakeview Christian Academy
The Marshall School

Eveleth

East Range Academy of Technology and Science
Eveleth-Gilbert High School

Tower

Tower-Soudan Secondary School
Vermilion Country School

Scott County
Belle Plaine High School, Belle Plaine
Jordan High School, Jordan
New Prague High School, New Prague
Prior Lake Senior School, Prior Lake
Shakopee High School, Shakopee

Sherburne County
Becker High School, Becker
Big Lake High School, Big Lake
Elk River High School, Elk River
Ivan Sand Community School, Elk River
Rivers Christian Academy, Elk River
Spectrum High School, Elk River
Zimmerman High School, Zimmerman

Sibley County
G.F.W. Senior School, Winthrop
Minnesota New Country School, Henderson
Sibley East High School, Arlington

Stearns County
Albany Senior School, Albany
Apollo High School, St. Cloud
Belgrade-Brooten-Elrosa High School, Belgrade
Cathedral High School/John XXIII, St. Cloud
Holdingford Secondary School, Holdingford
Kimball High School, Kimball
Melrose High School, Melrose
Paynesville Senior School, Paynesville
Rocori High School, Cold Spring
St. John's Preparatory School, Collegeville
Sartell High School, Sartell
Sauk Centre Secondary School, Sauk Centre
Technical High School, St. Cloud

Steele County
Blooming Prairie High School, Blooming Prairie
Medford Secondary School, Medford
Owatonna Senior High School, Owatonna

Stevens County
Chokio-Alberta High School, Alberta
Hancock Secondary School, Hancock
Morris Area Secondary School, Morris

Swift County
Benson High School, Benson
Kerkhoven-Murdock-Sunburg Secondary School, Kerkhoven
Lac Qui Parle Valley High School

Todd County
Bertha-Hewitt High School, Bertha
Browerville High School, Browerville
Eagle Valley Secondary School, Eagle Bend
Long Prairie-Grey Senior School, Long Prairie
Staples-Motley Senior School, Staples NYM

Traverse County
Wheaton High School, Wheaton

Wabasha County
Lincoln Secondary School, Lake City
Plainview/Elgin/Millville, Plainview, Elgin
River Valley Academy, Kellogg
Wabasha-Kellogg Secondary School, Wabasha

Wadena County
Menahga Secondary School, Menahga
Sebeka Secondary School, Sebeka
Verndale Secondary School, Verndale
Wadena-Deer Creek Senior High School, Wadena

Waseca County
Janesville-Waldorf-Pemberton High School, Janesville
NRHEG High School, New Richland
Waseca Senior High School, Waseca

Washington County
East Ridge High School, Woodbury
Forest Lake Area High School, Forest Lake
Hope Christian Academy, St. Paul Park
Mahtomedi High School, Mahtomedi
Math and Science Academy
New Life Academy, Woodbury
North Lakes Academy
Park High School, Cottage Grove
St. Croix Preparatory Academy, Stillwater
Southwest Junior High School, Forest Lake
Stillwater Area High School, Stillwater
Tartan Senior High School, Oakdale
Woodbury Senior High School, Woodbury

Watonwan County
Butterfield-Odin Schools, Butterfield
Madelia Secondary School, Madelia
St. James High School, St. James

Wilkin County
Breckenridge Senior School, Breckenridge
Campbell-Tintah Secondary School, Campbell
Rothsay Secondary School, Rothsay

Winona County
Cotter High School, Winona
Hope Lutheran High School, Winona
Lewiston-Altura Secondary School, Lewiston
Riverway Secondary School, Minnesota City
St. Charles High School, St. Charles
Winona Senior High School, Winona

Wright County
Annandale High School, Annandale
Buffalo High School, Buffalo
Dassel-Cokato Senior School, Cokato
Delano High School, Delano
Howard Lake-Waverly-Winsted Secondary School, Howard Lake
Maple Lake Secondary School, Maple Lake
Monticello High School, Monticello
St. Michael-Albertville High School, Albertville

Yellow Medicine County
Canby High School, Canby
ECHO Charter School, Echo
Yellow Medicine East High School, Granite Falls

Online schools
Minnesota Online High School, statewide
T4N Pinnacle Academy

See also
List of school districts in Minnesota

References

Minnesota
High schools